Arslanlı  (formerly Akkuyu) is a village in Erdemli district of Mersin Province, Turkey. The population of the village was 548  as of 2012. The village is at the junction of village roads from Erdemli, one to north and one to west. (The road to west leads to some ruins of the ancient ages.) Thus the village is a convenient place as a stop for passengers to other villages and there are a number of self-service kebab shops (known as Kendin pişir kendin ye). Major economic activity is farming.

References

Villages in Erdemli District